Dam Qanat-e Jowngan (also Romanized as Dam Qanāt-e Jowngān; also known as Dam Qanāt) is a village in Bakesh-e Yek Rural District, in the Central District of Mamasani County, Fars Province, Iran. At the 2006 census, its population was 445, in 97 families.

References 

Populated places in Mamasani County